The church of Sant'Egidio in Borgo, ...a Borgo, or ...in Vaticano (Saint Giles in Borgo or at the Vatican), is a Roman Catholic oratory in Vatican City dedicated to Saint Giles.

History 
Pope Alexander III conceded the church to the Order of the Holy Sepulchre with the mission to restore the church and its hospital.

Pope Pius XI gave the church to the Franciscan Missionaries of Mary.

Notes

References 

 
 
 
 

Churches in Vatican City
Order of the Holy Sepulchre
Franciscan Missionaries of Mary